The canton of Aix-les-Bains-1 is an administrative division of the Savoie department, southeastern France. It was created at the French canton reorganisation which came into effect in March 2015. Its seat is in Aix-les-Bains.

It consists of the following communes:

Aix-les-Bains (partly)
La Biolle
Brison-Saint-Innocent
Entrelacs
Grésy-sur-Aix
Montcel
Pugny-Chatenod
Saint-Offenge
Saint-Ours
Trévignin

References

Cantons of Savoie